The 2020–21 Azerbaijan Premier League was the 29th season of the Azerbaijan Premier League, the highest tier football league of Azerbaijan. The season began on 21 August 2020 and ended on 19 May 2021.

Neftçi Baku were the champions, winning the league for the 9th time in their history and ending Qarabağ FK’s 7 year winning streak. They qualified for the first qualifying round of the 2021–22 Champions League. Qarabağ and Sumgayit earned places in the second qualifying round of the UEFA Europa Conference League.

Teams

Stadia and locations
''Note: Table lists in alphabetical order.

Stadiums

Personnel and kits

Note: Flags indicate national team as has been defined under FIFA eligibility rules. Players and Managers may hold more than one non-FIFA nationality.

Managerial changes

Foreign players
A team could use only six foreign players on the field in each game.

In bold: Players that capped for their national team.

League table

Fixtures and results
Clubs played each other four times for a total of 28 matches each.

Matches 1–14

Matches 15–28

Season statistics

Top scorers

Clean sheets

See also
 Azerbaijan Premier League
 Azerbaijan First Division
 Azerbaijan Cup

References

External links
UEFA

2020–21 in European association football leagues
2020-21
1